Donald G. Ivey (6 February 1922 - 25 June 2018) was the principal of the University of Toronto's New College from 1963 to 1974.

Career
After receiving his PhD in 1949, he joined the University of Toronto’s Department of Physics as Assistant Professor of Physics, becoming a full Professor in 1963.

In collaboration with his colleague Patterson Hume, Ivey helped to steer the teaching of physics in a new direction through the use of educational television programs and movies. Hume and Ivey prepared and presented over one hundred television programs for the Canadian Broadcasting Corporation on various physics topics. Short films such as Frames of Reference and the TV show The Nature of Things used humour and creative camerawork to make physics accessible to a wider range of students.

Ivey was Principal of New College and Vice-President of the University of Toronto. Upon his retirement, he was appointed Professor emeritus in 1987. He died on June 25, 2018.

He received numerous awards throughout his career, including the Award of Honour from the University of Notre Dame in 1965 and the Robert A. Millikan award from the American Association of Physics Teachers for "notable and creative contributions to the teaching of physics" in 1987. For the education work he carried out with Hume, an asteroid (number 22415) was named HumeIvey in their honour.

References

Sources
Great Teachers from our Past University of Toronto
On Beyond Darwin, Chapter 1
Obituary

External links

 CBC TV programs with Donald G. Ivey
 Donald G. Ivey Library
 Frames of Reference
 Download or watch online: Frames of Reference (1960)
 On Beyond Darwin by Patterson Hume
 
 

1922 births
Canadian education writers
Canadian educators
Canadian physicists
Canadian television hosts
Canadian textbook writers
Canadian university and college vice-presidents
People from Parkland Region, Manitoba
University of Toronto alumni
Academic staff of the University of Toronto
2018 deaths